El Pueyo de Araguás (in Aragonese: O Pueyo d'Araguás) is a municipality located in the province of Huesca, Aragon, Spain. According to the 2018 census (INE), the municipality has a population of 154 inhabitants.

Villages 
Araguás, Los Molinos, La Muera, Oncíns, La Pardina del Soto, El Plano, El Pueyo de Araguás, San Lorién, San Victorián de Asán, El Soto and Torrelisa.

References

See also
Peña Montañesa
Real Monasterio de San Victorián

Municipalities in the Province of Huesca